Gribthorpe is a hamlet in the East Riding of Yorkshire, England.

Gribthorpe forms part of the civil parish of Foggathorpe.

In 1823 Gribthorpe (also known as Gripthorpe), was in the civil parish of Bubwith and the Wapentake of Harthill. Population at the time, which included Willitoft, was 145, with occupations including four farmers.

References

External links

Villages in the East Riding of Yorkshire